Lacey and His Friends is a 1986 compilation of science fiction short stories by American writer David Drake, published in 1986 by Baen Books. It contains five stories, three of which are about the titular Jed Lacey, a ruthless individual, convicted for raping a former contemporary as an act of revenge for betraying him, turned detective by a computer that allocates people to work in areas where their "psych profile" indicates they will be effective. The other stories are two unconnected, time travel stories. Lacey lives in a world of constant sousveillance and surveillance. People have chosen to live in this world rather than it being enforced from above by an unelected and unaccountable government. The government, in choosing to ignore its own laws, sets Lacey free from his former punishment in exchange for his silence about its own apparently illegal activities.

External links 
 
 David Drake's comments concerning the book and its effect on him
 Grimmer Than Hell, a collection of Drake's shorter works, including the three Lacey stories, free online from Baen Books

1986 short story collections
Science fiction short story collections
Baen Books books